Should the Wind Drop (Yerb vor k’amin handartvi, previously known as Should the Wind Fall) is a 2020 Armenian-Belgian-French drama film directed by Nora Martirosyan and starring Grégoire Colin and Hayk Bakhryan. The film was produced by Sister Productions in France, Kwassa Films in Belgium, and Aneva in Armenia. The film was selected for the 73rd edition of the Cannes Festival. The film was screened in the 2020 Angoulême Film Festival. The film was screened as part of Industry Selects at the 2020 Toronto International Film Festival. The film was screened in the competition part of the 2020 Tokyo Filmex. It was also selected as the Armenian entry for the Best International Feature Film at the 94th Academy Awards.

Plot
An auditor is charged with appraising if Stepanakert Airport in the small, breakaway Republic of Artsakh in the Caucasus meets international aviation standards. He finds himself connecting with a young local boy to help the isolated territory open up to the outside world.

See also
 List of submissions to the 94th Academy Awards for Best International Feature Film
 List of Armenian submissions for the Academy Award for Best International Feature Film

References

External links
Should the Wind Drop on L'Acid
Should the Wind Drop on Sister Productions
Should the Wind Drop on Kwassa Films
Should the Wind Drop on Rouge Distribution 

2020 films
2020 drama films
2020 multilingual films
Armenian multilingual films
Belgian multilingual films
French multilingual films
English-language Armenian films
English-language Belgian films
English-language French films
2020s French films